Ili Cheng (born Cheng Chia-chen, ; 31 August 1993), nicknamed Jipai Mei, is a Taiwanese internet celebrity and model, who has appeared in television programmes, feature films, videos and a music EP. She came to fame in January 2012 when her promotional video for a fried chicken cutlet restaurant went viral. Thereafter she became an internet celebrity.

Early life 
Her parents divorced when she was seven. Her father, being much richer than her mother, gained custody of her and her younger brother, but they did not live with their father. Instead, they lived together with his father's ex-wife and four older half-siblings on his father's side. Her mother died of stomach cancer when she was 17.

She changed her name to Cheng Chia-chun (鄭家純) in 2013.

Career 
She started working as a part-time model in mid-July 2011. In 2012, she was featured in a promotional video, which became viral, for a chicken cutlet shop.

Political views 

Cheng actively engages in political discussion covering a wide range of issues. She has been supporting anti-nuclear movement in Taiwan since 2013. She joined the Sunflower Student Movement in 2014. She supports Hong Kong democracy movements.

Personal life 
On 2 November 2022, Cheng married with a Japanese pediatrician named Akira.

Works

Photo albums
15 August 2012 18 Sui De Liwu  
26 February 2013 The gift of 18th–Lili Shashin-shū  
22 July 2015 Wo Shi Zheng Jiachun

Japanese photo DVD
16 November 2012 Ili The First, First! Ili (DVD)
26 April 2013 Ili "Yakusoku..." (DVD)
26 April 2013 Ili "Yakusoku..." (Blu-ray 3D)
26 July 2013 I'm iLi (DVD)
26 July 2013 I'm iLi (Blu-ray)

Films
2013 Campus Confidential as Wu Yifen
2015 One Night in Taipei as Hong Dou
2016 True Love is Ghost

Dramas

Dubbing

Music videos
November 2012: Forgive Me - Fir A Qin Real
December 2013: Wo Bu Dong Ai - Ryan

Records

References

Notes

External links

 

The viral video that launched Cheng's career: 

1993 births
Living people
Taiwanese female models